Qanbar Ali-ye Olya (also Romanized as Qanbar ‘Alī-ye ‘Olyā and Qanbar‘alī-ye ‘Olyā) is a village in Qalayi Rural District, Firuzabad District, Selseleh County, Lorestan Province, Iran. At the 2006 census, its population was 32, in 7 families.

References 

Towns and villages in Selseleh County